Cyril VIII Geha (or Jeha), (November 26, 1840 – January 11, 1916)  was patriarch of the Melkite Greek Catholic Church from 1902 until 1916. He was the last Melkite Catholic patriarch of the Ottoman era.

Life
Geha was born in Aleppo, Syria in 1840, he was consecrated the Melkite Catholic Archbishop of Aleppo on May 3, 1885 by patriarch Gregory II Youssef. On June 29, 1902 he became patriarch of the Melkites.

In 1909 Cyril convoked a synod at Ain Traz to develop the disciplinary legislation of the Melkite Church. However, the work of the synod failed to gain confirmation from Pope Pius X, who lacked the desire of his predecessor, Pope Leo XIII, to promote the traditional rights and privileges of the Eastern Churches.

Upon Cyril's death in 1916 the patriarchal see was vacant until the election of Demetrius I Qadi in 1919.

Distinctions
 Order of Saint Lazarus (statuted 1910)

See also
List of Melkite Greek Catholic Patriarchs of Antioch

Notes

References

External links
Melkite Greek Catholic Patriarchate of Antioch, Alexandria and Jerusalem
L'Église Melkite/The Melkite Church.
Melkite Catholic Web Ring.
Extensive history of the Melkite Church
Catholic Hierarchy

Melkite Greek Catholic Patriarchs of Antioch
1840 births
1916 deaths
Recipients of the Order of Saint Lazarus (statuted 1910)
Grand Masters of the Order of Saint Lazarus (statuted 1910)